À La Bien Mix Party (meaning "quietly") is a compilation series by DJ Hamida mixing various acts but mainly from North Africa and other African acts in various genres of music, promoting what he calls "Meknessi Style".

The 2014 edition of the series, so far the most successful of the series, reached number 10 on SNEP, the official French Albums Chart, also charting in Belgium's Ultratop chart, with "Déconnectés" becoming the official debut release from the album. Five tracks from the album À la bien mix party have made it to the French SNEP Top 200 Singles Chart. DJ Hamida also engaged in a tour in support of the album release.

À la bien mix party 2011
Full title: DJ Hamida presente À la bien mix party 2011
Tracks: 43
Date released: June 2011
Record label: DJ Hamida

À la bien mix party 2012
Tracks: 37
Date released: 24 June 2012
Record label: Dj Hamida

À la bien mix party 2013
Full title: DJ Hamida presente À la bien mix party 2013
Tracks: 32
Date released: 12 July 2013
Record label: Meknessityle

À la bien mix party 2014
Tracks: 30
Date released: 2 June 2014
Record label: SIX-O-NINE / MUSICAST
Charts

Charting singles from the album

Mix party 2015

Also known as DJ Hamida Mix party 2015
Tracks: 34
Date released: 25 May 2014
Record label: Definite Pop 
Charts

Charting singles from the album

Mix party 2016
Also known as DJ Hamida Mix party 2016
Tracks: 34
Date released: 25 May 2014
Record label: Definite Pop 
Charts

À la bien Mix Party 2017
Tracks: 22
Release date: 19 May 2017
Record label: Meknessi Style Records / Musicast
Charts

À la bien Mix Party 2018
Tracks: 21
Date released: 22 June 2018
Record label: Meknessi Style Records
Charts

À la bien Mix Party 2019
Tracks: 20
Date released: 5 July 2019
Record label: Meknessi Style Records
Charts

À la bien Mix Party 2020
Tracks: 24
Date released: 31 July 2020
Record label: Believe / Meknessi Style Records
Charts

References

External links
DJ Hamida Facebook
DJ Hamida YouTube

Compilation album series